JazakAllah or Jazāk Allāhu Khayran is a term used as an Islamic expression of gratitude meaning "May Allah reward you [with] goodness." The phrase JazakAllah itself is incomplete. It includes Allah, the Arabic word for God, and jazaka, which refers to the act of rewarding, but it leaves out khayr, which refers to the "good". Stating Jazak Allahu Khayran in full leaves no presumption regarding what the reward is because it is specified by the word khayr.

Although the common Arabic word for "thanks" is shukran, Jazāk Allāhu Khayran is often used by Muslims instead, in the belief that Allah's reward is superior. The common response to Jazāk Allāhu Khayran is wa ʾiyyāk, or wa ʾiyyākum for plural, which means "and to you". A more formal reply is "wa ʾantum fa-jazākumu-llāhu khayran" which means "And you too, may Allah reward you with goodness".
Usamah bin Zaid narrated that the Messenger of Allah (s.a.w) said: “Whoever some good was done to him, and he says: ‘May Allah reward you in goodness’ then he has done the most that he can of praise.”

Notes

References

External links 
 Key to Islamic Terms 
 Jazak Allahu Khairan Meaning and Answer

Arabic words and phrases
Gratitude
Islamic terminology